The 2001–02 NBA season was the 32nd season for the Portland Trail Blazers in the National Basketball Association. During the off-season, head coach Mike Dunleavy was fired after four years and two trips to the Western Conference finals, and was replaced with Maurice Cheeks, as the Blazers acquired Derek Anderson and Steve Kerr from the San Antonio Spurs, signed free agent Ruben Patterson, and re-signed former Blazers center Chris Dudley. Kerr would reunite with his former teammate of the Chicago Bulls, former All-Star forward Scottie Pippen, where they won three championships in the late 1990s. The Blazers struggled with a 13–18 start after losing six straight games between December and January, but managed to hold a 25–23 record at the All-Star break, and then posted a 12-game winning streak between February and March, finishing third in the Pacific Division and sixth in the Western Conference with a 49–33 record, and making the playoffs for the 20th consecutive year.

Rasheed Wallace averaged 19.3 points, 8.2 rebounds and 1.3 blocks per game, while Bonzi Wells averaged 17.0 points, 6.0 rebounds and 1.5 steals per game, and Damon Stoudamire provided the team with 13.5 points and 6.5 assists per game. In addition, Patterson contributed 11.2 points per game, while Anderson contributed 10.8 points per game, Pippen provided with 10.6 points, 5.9 assists and 1.6 steals per game, and Dale Davis averaged 9.5 points and 8.8 rebounds per game.

As in the previous year, the Blazers faced the two-time defending NBA champion Los Angeles Lakers in the Western Conference First Round of the playoffs, and the result was identical: the Blazers were swept in three straight games by the Lakers, who would go on to win their third consecutive NBA championship. It was the fifth time in six years the Blazers' postseason run was ended by the Lakers. The Lakers would then go on to defeat the New Jersey Nets in four straight games in the NBA Finals, winning their third consecutive championship.

Following the season, Shawn Kemp signed as a free agent with the Orlando Magic, and Kerr was traded back to his former team, the San Antonio Spurs.

Draft picks

Roster

Regular season

Season standings

z - clinched division title
y - clinched division title
x - clinched playoff spot

Record vs. opponents

Game log

Playoffs

| home_wins = 0
| home_losses = 1
| road_wins = 0
| road_losses = 2
}}
|- align="center" bgcolor="#ffcccc"
| 1
| April 21
| @ L.A. Lakers
| L 87–95
| Rasheed Wallace (25)
| Rasheed Wallace (14)
| Bonzi Wells (6)
| Staples Center18,997
| 0–1
|- align="center" bgcolor="#ffcccc"
| 2
| April 25
| @ L.A. Lakers
| L 96–103
| Rasheed Wallace (31)
| Rasheed Wallace (11)
| Damon Stoudamire (5)
| Staples Center18,997
| 0–2
|- align="center" bgcolor="#ffcccc"
| 3
| April 28
| L.A. Lakers
| L 91–92
| Rasheed Wallace (20)
| Rasheed Wallace (12)
| Scottie Pippen (8)
| Rose Garden20,580
| 0–3
|-

Player statistics

NOTE: Please write the players statistics in alphabetical order by last name.

Season

Playoffs

Awards and records

Transactions

References

Portland Trail Blazers seasons
Portland Trail Blazers 2001
Port
Port
Port
Portland Trail Blazers